These are tables of congressional delegations from Indiana to the United States House of Representatives and the United States Senate.

Since its statehood in 1816, the U.S. state of Indiana has sent congressional delegations to the United States Senate and United States House of Representatives. Each state elects two senators statewide to serve for six years, and their elections are staggered to be held in two of every three even-numbered years—Indiana's Senate election years are to Classes I and III. Before the Seventeenth Amendment in 1913, Senators were elected by the Indiana General Assembly. Members of the House of Representatives are elected to two-year terms, one from each of Indiana's nine congressional districts. Before becoming a state, the Indiana Territory elected delegates at-large and sent three to Congress, but the territorial delegates were restricted from voting on legislation.

The longest-serving of any of Indiana's Congressmen is Senator Richard Lugar, serving from 1977 to 2013. The longest-serving House member is Lee H. Hamilton, who served from 1965 to 1999. There have been 347 people who have represented Indiana in Congress: 321 in the House, 27 in the Senate, and 18 in both houses, with an average term of seven years. Indiana has elected seven women and three African Americans to Congress.

The current dean of the Indiana delegation is Representative André Carson (IN-7), having served in Congress since 2008.

U.S. House of Representatives

Current members 
List of members of the House delegation, their terms in office, district boundaries, and the district political ratings according to the CPVI. The delegation has a total of 9 members, including 7 Republicans and 2 Democrats.

Members of the House of Representatives are elected every two years by popular vote within a congressional district. Indiana has nine congressional districts—this number is reapportioned based on the state's population, determined every ten years by a census. Indiana had a maximum representation of 13 congressmen from 1873 to 1933. Since 2003 Indiana has had nine representatives, which was reduced from ten after the 2000 census. This gives Indiana the fourteenth-largest delegation; during the period from 1853 to 1873 the state had the fifth-largest delegation.

Historical timeline 
Indiana has been represented by 322 people in the House, including 1 who was previously a territorial delegate.

1815–1823: 1 at-large seat

1823–1833: 3 seats

1833–1843: 7 seats

1843–1853:10 seats

1853–1875: 11, then 13 seats

1875–1933: 13 seats

1933–1983: 12, then 11 seats

1983–2003: 10 seats

2003–present: 9 seats

U.S. Senate 

Each state elects two senators by statewide popular vote every six years. The terms of the two senators are staggered so that they are not elected in the same year. Indiana's senators are elected in the years from classes 1 and 3. Senators were originally chosen by the Indiana General Assembly until the Seventeenth Amendment came into force in 1913.

Of the forty-six men who have been senators from Indiana, there have been three Democratic-Republicans, three Adams Republicans (including James Noble, who was both a Democratic-Republican and Adams Republican), two Whigs, one Unionist, twenty-one Democrats, and seventeen Republicans.

See also

List of United States congressional districts
Indiana's congressional districts
Political party strength in Indiana

Notes

References 

 
 
Indiana
Politics of Indiana
Congressional delegations